Kaukab Hameed Khan (born 1957) was an Indian politician. During his career he was a member of Indian National Congress, Bharatiya Kranti Dal and Rashtriya Lok Dal parties in 2018. he died in 2018.

He represented Bagpat (Assembly constituency) in the 09th Legislative Assembly of Uttar Pradesh, 12th Legislative Assembly of Uttar Pradesh, 13th Legislative Assembly of Uttar Pradesh, 14th Legislative Assembly of Uttar Pradesh and 15th Legislative Assembly of Uttar Pradesh.

References 

Living people
1957 births
Uttar Pradesh politicians
Indian National Congress (Organisation) politicians
Rashtriya Lok Dal politicians
Indian National Congress politicians from Uttar Pradesh